Joshua's blind snake (Trilepida joshuai) is a species of snake in the family Leptotyphlopidae. The species is endemic to Colombia.

Etymology
The specific name, joshuai, is a reference to Joshua, victor at the Battle of Jericho, in reference to the type locality, Jericó, Antioquia, Colombia.

Geographic range
T. joshuai is found in the Colombian departments of Antioquia, Caldas, and Valle del Cauca.

Description
T. joshuai is black dorsally, and white ventrally.

Reproduction
T. joshuai is oviparous.

References

Further reading
Adalsteinsson SA, Branch WR, Trape S, Vitt LJ, Hedges SB (2009). "Molecular phylogeny, classification, and biogeography of snakes of the family Leptotyphlopidae (Reptilia, Squamata)". Zootaxa 2244: 1-50. (Tricheilostoma joshuai, new combination).
Dunn ER (1944). "A Review of the Colombian Snakes of the Families Typhlopidae and Leptotyphlopidae". Caldasia 3 (11): 47–55. (Leptotyphlops joshuai, new species, pp. 53–54, Figures 9–10).
Hedges SB (2011). "The type species of the threadsnake genus Tricheilostoma Jan revisited (Squamata: Leptotyphlopidae)". Zootaxa 3027: 63–64. (Trilepida joshuai, new combination, p. 63).

Trilepida
Reptiles of Colombia
Reptiles described in 1944
Joshua